Sidalcea cusickii, or Cusick's checkerbloom, is a species of flowering plant in the family Malvaceae. It is endemic to Oregon in the United States.

This species is a perennial herb reaching 1.8 meters in maximum height. It grows from a thick taproot and rhizomes. It produces several purple-tinged, often hollow stems lined with toothed, palmate leaves. They bear dense, spike-shaped inflorescences of many flowers.

This plant grows in moist to wet areas with fertile soils, such as mountain meadows. It may be associated with rushes and camas.

References

External links

Sidalcea cusickii. NatureServe.
CalPhotos.

cusickii
Flora of Oregon

Endemic flora of Oregon
Endemic flora of the United States